George Douglas may refer to:

George Douglas, 1st Earl of Angus (1380–1403), Scottish magnate
George Douglas, 4th Earl of Angus (c. 1417–1463), Scottish magnate
George Douglas, Master of Angus (1469–1513), Scottish nobleman
George Douglas of Pittendreich (died 1552), Master of Angus, Scottish nobleman
George Douglas (bishop) (died 1589), Scottish prelate, Bishop of Moray
George Douglas (diplomat) (died 1636), English ambassador to Poland 1634–1636
George Douglas (Royal Navy officer),  first captain of HMS Ardent (1764)
George Douglas (footballer) (1893–1979), English association footballer
George Douglas, 16th Earl of Morton (1761–1827), Scottish aristocrat
George Douglas, 1st Earl of Dumbarton (1635–1692), Scottish nobleman and soldier
George Douglas, 2nd Earl of Dumbarton (1687–1749), Scottish nobleman and soldier
George Douglas, 4th Lord Mordington (died 1741)
George Douglas, 13th Earl of Morton (1662–1738), British peer and politician
George Douglas, 17th Earl of Morton (1789–1858), Scottish Tory politician
George Douglas Brown (1869–1902), Scottish Victorian novelist
George Douglas (priest) (1889–1973), Dean of Argyll and The Isles
George Douglas-Hamilton, 10th Earl of Selkirk (1906–1994), Scottish aristocrat and First Lord of the Admiralty
George Brisbane Scott Douglas (1856–1935), Scottish poet and writer
George Douglas, the pen name of songwriter Bob Thiele (1922–1996)
George Douglas (rugby), rugby union and rugby league player
Sir George Douglas, 2nd Baronet (1754–1821), MP for Roxburghshire, 1784–1806
George Henry Scott-Douglas (1825–1885), MP for Roxburghshire, 1874–1880
Sir George Brisbane Douglas, 5th Baronet (1856–1935), of the Douglas baronets
George Douglas (actor) (1903–1983), American actor
George Douglas (golfer), Scottish golfer
George Douglas (martyr) (1540–1587), one of the Eighty-five martyrs of England and Wales
George Douglas, pen name of Lady Gertrude Stock (1842–1893), English writer and aristocrat
G. C. M. Douglas (George Cunningham Monteath Douglas, 1826–1904), Moderator of the General Assembly of the Free Church of Scotland, 1894–95

See also